Makabana is a district in the Niari Department of Republic of the Congo.

References 

Niari Department
Districts of the Republic of the Congo